The 1906–07 team finished with a record of 2–8. It was the fourth year for head coach Wilbur P. Bowen. The team captain was C.P. Steimle and the team manager was E.A. Stewart.

Roster

Schedule

|-
!colspan=9 style="background:#006633; color:#FFFFFF;"| Non-conference regular season

1. Media guide shows 14-25 and yearbook shows 19-24.

2. Media guide shows 13-72 and yearbook shows 15-72.

3. Adrian shows the game being played on March 15, EMU shows no date. EMU shows March 15 being against CMU.

References

Eastern Michigan Eagles men's basketball seasons
Michigan State Normal